Drita may refer to:
 Drita (name), an Albanian female name, with the meaning "light"
 Drita (magazine), an Albanian magazine founded by Petro Poga
 Drita Albanian Folk Orchestra, an Albanian folk orchestra in Los Angeles, California
 FC Drita, a football club based in Gjilan, Kosovo
 FK Drita, a football club based in the village of Bogovinje near Tetovo, North Macedonia